Tim O'Neill (born October 17, 1979) is a Canadian football offensive lineman of the Canadian Football League.  He was drafted by the Edmonton Eskimos in the third round of the 2005 CFL Draft. He played CIS Football for the Calgary Dinos.

On February 10, 2017, at age 37, O'Neill informed the BC Lions of his intention to retire.

References

External links
Hamilton Tiger-Cats bio 

1979 births
Living people
Calgary Dinos football players
Calgary Stampeders players
Canadian football offensive linemen
Edmonton Elks players
Hamilton Tiger-Cats players
Sportspeople from Victoria, British Columbia
Players of Canadian football from British Columbia